Country town icons may refer to:
Australia's big things, country town icons in Australia
List of New Zealand's big things, country town icons in New Zealand